Patricia "Trish" Cockrem (born 17 May 1961) is a former Australian women's basketball player.

Biography

Cockrem played for the national team between 1981 and 1986, competing at the 1984 Olympic Games in Los Angeles. Cockrem also represented Australia at the 1983 World Championship held in Brazil.

In the domestic Women's National Basketball League (WNBL) Cockrem played 117 games for both the St Kilda Saints and the Brisbane Blazers. Following her international retirement in 1986, Cockrem went on to coach junior developmental squads in Queensland.

References

External links
 
 
 

1961 births
Living people
Australian women's basketball players
Olympic basketball players of Australia
Basketball players at the 1984 Summer Olympics